Mohammed Abdulrahman (born 16 September 1989) is a Nigerian professional footballer who plays as a striker for Swedish club .

Career
Abdulrahman scored 16 goals in the Division 2 Östra Götaland for Motala AIF in the 2010 season. In January 2011, he signed a three-year contract with IF Elfsborg, and was immediately loaned out to GAIS.

Abdulrahman scored in his first two matches for GAIS, against Norwegian IK Start and Halmstads BK in the friendly tournament Color Line Cup in Kristiansand in January 2011. However, he injured his cruciate ligament in a pre-season match against Qviding FIF and missed the entire 2011 season. In 2012 he played for IFK Värnamo, and in 2013 he played again for GAIS. Before the 2014 season, Abdulrahman returned to Motala AIF.

In November 2016, Abdulrahman signed for Division 2 club .

References

External links
 
 
 
 

1989 births
Living people
Nigerian footballers
Association football forwards
Syrianska FC players
Arameisk-Syrianska IF players
Motala AIF players
IF Elfsborg players
GAIS players
IFK Värnamo players
Ettan Fotboll players
Division 2 (Swedish football) players
Allsvenskan players
Superettan players
Division 3 (Swedish football) players